Theodore Anthony Sarandos Jr. is an American businessman who is the co-chief executive officer of Netflix.

Early life
Sarandos was born in Phoenix, Arizona. His father was Ted Sarandos Sr., an electrician, and his mother was a stay-at-home mom. He is the fourth of five children, with three older sisters and a younger brother. Sarandos' paternal grandfather came from the Greek island of Samos to the United States. His grandfather's family name was originally Kariotakis but he changed it to Sarandos.

As a child, Sarandos spent hours watching TV shows like I Love Lucy, The Jack Benny Program and The Andy Griffith Show. He stated that his family did not travel much "so the way to see the world was through books and movies and television." In his teens, he developed a knowledge of film and TV, and strong instincts for what people liked while working at a video store. While writing for his high school newspaper, Sarandos met and interviewed the actor Ed Asner, who was in Phoenix for a local Screen Actors Guild meeting. Asner, then in the height of his Lou Grant period, introduced Sarandos to others in the entertainment industry, for further interviews and connected his interests in entertainment, politics, and journalism. Sarandos attended Glendale Community College in Glendale, Arizona.

He was promoted to store manager of the Arizona Video Cassettes West chain in 1983 and managed eight retail video stores until 1988. In 1988, Sarandos became Western Regional Director of Sales and Operations for one of the largest video distributors in the United States, East Texas Distributors (ETD). Until March 2000, Sarandos was Vice President of Product and Merchandising for the almost 500 store chain, Video City/West Coast Video. While at West Coast Video, he was responsible for negotiating revenue deals to migrate the company from the VHS format into the DVD format.

Netflix 
After meeting Netflix CEO Reed Hastings in 1999, Sarandos joined Netflix in 2000. He serves as its co-chief executive officer and chief content officer, overseeing Netflix's original programming and entertainment efforts. He is also a member of the Peabody Awards board of directors, which is presented by the University of Georgia's Henry W. Grady College of Journalism and Mass Communication.

Sarandos was responsible for initiating the first round of original programming at Netflix, starting with Lilyhammer, and then continuing with the breakout David Fincher series starring Kevin Spacey, House of Cards. Beginning with House of Cards, which was bought for $100 million in a March 2011 deal, Sarandos created the model where Netflix purchases multiple seasons of shows without pilot orders. Sarandos sees the focus as being on subscriber growth as a reflection of revenue health over ratings. This has since changed as Netflix has recently decided to initiate an Ad-Supported model which allows the users to pay a lower price but have advertisements on their site, this was also believed to be the work of Ted Sarandos.

Sarandos uses algorithms at Netflix to predict what programs viewers will want to watch prior to producing them. His personal algorithm focuses on 30% judgement (as a highest priority), with 70% focused on a base of data. He also said that the focus is on the audience, and that there is no programming grid – or appointment linear-based television – that is typically used by traditional TV networks. Barometers of success are if the audience completes watching the show, the timeframe within which they finish watching a series if there is social media buzz by critics and fans. Sarandos said that the preference is for a show to run for multiple seasons and build a fan base. Sarandos believes the model allows the viewer to be in control, and to watch only the content they enjoy. The more serialized the show is, the longer the revenue stream. Sarandos sees cost per hour basis as greater the more total run time there is across the lifetime of a show, as it is often not cost savings to produce less original content once production is underway.

Sarandos said the comparison of TV network ratings to Netflix isn't meaningful as the typical Netflix release model of pushing out content is full season availability at once. No advertising means there's no need for typical ratings. He said Netflix aggregates audiences over a very long period of time, where Netflix can tell if a show will be successful by using a regression models that tells Netflix, based on the first hour of viewing, how successful the show will be over the life of its license.

Sarandos has been outspoken about discarding or not holding important traditional network models. Although historically a big broadcast TV fan, he describes the model as now becoming archaic. Sarandos said he sees the new model as a way to prioritize the needs and desires of the consumer. Part of this is the refusal to release ratings and metrics of viewership. International reach and long tail, niche appeal is also an important part of the business model. The spend is typically a large upfront payment, with no back-end fees to talent and creators, especially of original content that Netflix owns. Sarandos said that he sees the Netflix brand as being based on personalization, that it was a deliberate choice on the part of Netflix to focus on providing diverse content that would appeal to the tastes of a broad base of viewers – one that would not be focused on a marquee show that Netflix would be known for, but quality shows that would appeal to different audiences.

Sarandos has said that he sees Netflix as a digital product, where the balance between distributing physical bits of content versus streaming digital content would be cheaper as both broadband and Netflix grew. The shift away from the DVD business came from this evaluation of new model focused on streaming and includes original programming, which is one of the main responsibilities of Sarandos' work at Netflix.

Sarandos set up a multi-picture deal with Adam Sandler, which was met with criticism. In defense, Sarandos said that the numbers make sense, something he characterizes as "data-influenced intuition," and that Sandler has a global appeal. Sarandos characterized Sandler's 2015 film The Ridiculous 6 as successful, saying it garnered the highest number of Netflix viewers streaming a film within the first 30 days of its release.

During the 2016 Television Critics Association presentation, Sarandos said he expects the amount Netflix spends on original programming to rise considerably. In terms of volume, Sarandos said that Netflix will be showing over 600 hours of original programming in 2016.

In 2020, Netflix announced Sarandos as its co-chief executive officer and member of the company's board of directors. Hastings had referred to Sarandos as his partner in running Netflix in previous years, specifically on film and TV production.

In 2022, Sarandos was named "Entertainment Person of the Year" at the Cannes Lions International Festival of Creativity in recognition for his work in entertainment marketing and communications.

On 19th January 2023, He became the co-CEO of Netflix along with Greg Peters after Reed Hasting stepped down and became the Executive Chairman.

Honors 
Under his leadership, the company received 54 Primetime Emmy Awards nominations in 2016.

 2008: Aspen Institute – Henry Crown Fellow
 2010: The Hollywood Reporter – "Digital Power 50"
 2012: The Hollywood Reporter – "Digital Power 50"
 2013: Time – Time 100
 2014: Simon Wiesenthal Center – Humanitarian Award
 2015: International Documentary Association – Pioneer Award
 2015: The Hollywood Reporter – "Silicon Beach Power 25"
 2015: NAPTE – Brandon Tartikoff Legacy Award
 Variety – "Global 5"
 The Hollywood Reporter – "Indie Power 50"
 The Harvard Lampoon – Honorary Member
 Cannes Lions International Festival of Creativity - 2022 Entertainment Person of the Year

Board and advisory work 
Sarandos is a member of several boards, including: 
 Chair of the Academy Museum of Motion Pictures (2020)
 Academy of Television Arts & Sciences, Executive Committee Appointee (2015), Member
 Digital Entertainment Group, Retail Advisory Board
 Exploring The Arts, Board of Trustees
 International Documentary Association, Trustee
 Los Angeles Greek Film Festival, Advisory Board
 Los Angeles Film Festival Film Independent, Film Advisory Board
 MediaRights.org, Board of Directors
 Tribeca Film Festival, Film Advisory Board
 Video Software Dealers Association, Former Chapter President & Board Member
 American Film Institute, Board of Trustees

Personal life 
Sarandos married Michelle Sarandos, his first wife, with whom he had two children, both graduates of Beverly Hills High School. In 2009, Sarandos married former United States Ambassador to the Bahamas (2009–2011), Nicole Avant, the daughter of former Motown Chairman Clarence Avant. The couple live in the Hancock Park neighborhood of Los Angeles, after previously living in Avant's home town of Beverly Hills, California. In 2013, the couple purchased a beach house formerly owned by David Spade in Malibu, California. Sarandos has said he is Catholic.

Sarandos and his wife held a fundraiser for President Barack Obama's 2012 campaign in Southern California in 2009, and raised over $700,000 for the Democratic candidate. This relationship was instrumental in getting the couple to sign a multiyear deal to produce series and films for the video service. Following the deal's announcement, some subscribers posted subscription cancellation screenshots on Twitter.

References

External links 

 

Living people
Businesspeople from Phoenix, Arizona
American people of Greek descent
Catholics from Arizona
Catholics from California
Entertainment industry businesspeople
Netflix people
Henry Crown Fellows
Year of birth missing (living people)